The Rural and Urban Political Party is a political party in Solomon Islands.

It was founded in June 2010 by MP Samuel Manetoali as a split-away from the Party for Rural Advancement, specifically to take part in the August 2010 general election.

The party's stated policy priorities upon its launch were economic growth and security. Manetoali called for small business centres to be set up all over the country, along with appropriate infrastructure, to enable local people's participation in business, and stimulate growth.

Manetoali was re-elected in his constituency of Gao-Bugotu, but no other candidate from the party obtained a seat. Manetoali then supported Danny Philip's successful bid for the premiership, and obtained the position of Minister for Tourism and Culture in Philip's Cabinet.

Notes

Political parties in the Solomon Islands
Political parties established in 2010
2010 establishments in the Solomon Islands